Paona Brajabasi was a Manipuri military officer. He was born in 1833 and later entered the military of the Manipur Kingdom, reaching the rank of major by 1891. The same year he fought in the Anglo-Manipur War against the British Empire. Following the defeat of his troops in a skirmish with the British, his adversaries offered to spare Brajabasi's life if he entered their service. Brajabasi refused and was subsequently executed. This act entered Manipur's popular imagination and Brajabasi has since been commemorated by a statue.

References 

Meitei people
Meitei warriors
1891 deaths
1833 births